Michael John Aziz is an American research scientist and engineer and the Gene and Tracy Sykes Professor of Materials and Energy Technologies at the Harvard John A. Paulson School of Engineering and Applied Sciences. He is an affiliated faculty member of the Harvard University Center for the Environment, for which he served from 2009 to 2018 as the faculty coordinator for the Graduate Consortium for Energy and Environment. He is also Chief Scientist and a co-founder of Quino Energy, Inc.

Early life
Aziz had received his B.S. from the California Institute of Technology in 1978 and then got his Ph.D. in applied physics from Harvard University in 1983 while working under the direction of David Turnbull. As a postdoc, he had spent two years at the Oak Ridge National Laboratory where he was a Eugene P. Wigner Postdoctoral Fellow. Since 1986 he has been a faculty member on what is now the Harvard John A. Paulson School of Engineering and Applied Sciences and he is currently the Gene and Tracy Sykes Professor of Materials and Energy Technologies.

Research
Starting in 2012, Aziz has worked with Alán Aspuru-Guzik, Roy Gordon and the United States Department of Energy to develop aqueous-soluble organic flow batteries for grid-scale electrical energy storage. In 2016 he used vitamin B2 to improve the work of an organic battery that was developed two years prior. The battery was later named Organic Mega Flow Battery, the research of which was published in journal Joule the same year. Some of his research has resulted in patents issued by the United States Patent and Trademark Office.

Awards
 1993 Fellow of the American Physical Society
 2004 Fellow of the American Association for the Advancement of Science
 2010 Materials Research Society fellow
 2016 Bruce Chalmers Award from The Minerals, Metals & Materials Society
 2019 Energy Frontiers Prize, ENI award

References

External links

20th-century births
Living people
California Institute of Technology alumni
Harvard School of Engineering and Applied Sciences alumni
John A. Paulson School of Engineering and Applied Sciences faculty
Year of birth missing (living people)
Place of birth missing (living people)